Mount Osceola is a  peak within the White Mountains of New Hampshire. Located in the White Mountain National Forest, the mountain is named for Osceola, the early-19th century Seminole leader. It is the highest peak in the Waterville Valley region.

Osceola can be ascended from the Greeley Pond Trail to the northeast of the mountain, which requires crossing the East Peak of Osceola first, or from the Tripoli Road to the south. There was a fire lookout tower at the top of the mountain, which significantly expanded the view from the peak, but it was taken down in the late 1970s. Views from the summit cover a large portion of the White Mountains, extending from Mount Washington in the northeast to the town of Waterville Valley in the south.

See also

 Four-thousand footers
 White Mountains Region
 List of mountains of New Hampshire

References

Mountains of New Hampshire
New England Four-thousand footers
Mountains of Grafton County, New Hampshire
New Hampshire placenames of Native American origin